The SECR D class is a class of 4-4-0 tender locomotives  designed by Harry Wainwright for the South Eastern and Chatham Railway.

Overview

The construction of the initial 20 engines was shared between Ashford railway works and the Glasgow builder, Sharp, Stewart and Company. The first of the class to enter service in 1901 was a Glasgow product, and by 1907 fifty-one were in traffic. Of these twenty-one were Ashford built while the rest were supplied by outside contractors.
The D class was a Harry Wainwright design and he was responsible for the overall look of the engine.  The detail work was undertaken by Robert Surtees, his chief draughtsman at Ashford works.

D1 class

In 1913, Richard Maunsell started the rebuilding of 21 D Class locomotives with Belpaire fireboxes to produce the more powerful D1 class. These bigger engines were needed to cope with increasing loads on the Kent Coast Line through Chatham.

Operation

Initially the D class was put to work on the Kent coast and Hastings services out of London.  By the 1930s the largest allocation of D class 4-4-0s was at Gillingham depot in Kent but they had by now been reduced to secondary train duties and were now carrying the livery of the Southern Railway. 
At the outbreak of World War II in 1939 some of the D class were placed into storage.  Then in 1941 others were transferred to Nine Elms depot.  A handful were based at Redhill on the Reading-Tonbridge cross-country line.

In 1948 British Railways inherited 28 of the Wainwright 4-4-0s.  Their final years saw them concentrated at Guildford in Surrey and the last of the D class, No.31075, was withdrawn from there in 1956.

Preservation

One engine, No.31737, has been preserved and is in its original livery – that of the South Eastern & Chatham Railway – at the National Railway Museum in York.

Models

Dapol, in association with Rails of Sheffield and Locomotion, released a model of the D Class in OO scale in 2021. On February 22, 2022, Dapol and Rails of Sheffield announced a further model of the D1 Class for release later that year.

References

Herring, Peter (2000) Classic British Steam Locomotives, Enderby: Abbeydale,

External links

NRM South Eastern & Chatham Railway steam locomotive No 737
Kent Rail D1 class page
Rail UK database entry

D
4-4-0 locomotives
Dübs locomotives
Sharp Stewart locomotives
Robert Stephenson and Company locomotives
Vulcan Foundry locomotives
Railway locomotives introduced in 1901
Standard gauge steam locomotives of Great Britain
Passenger locomotives